Brossard (known as Rive-Sud during early development) is an unopened Réseau express métropolitain station in the city of Brossard, Quebec, Canada.

The station is slated to serve as a regional transit hub for Exo buses and will also serve as a maintenance centre for REM operations. It will be accessible via de Rome Boulevard. The opening is slated for the second quarter of 2023.

References

Railway stations in Montérégie
Buildings and structures in Brossard
Réseau express métropolitain railway stations
Transport in Brossard
Railway stations scheduled to open in 2023